Solariella galkini is a species of sea snail, a marine gastropod mollusk in the family Solariellidae.

Description
The size of the shell attains 6 mm.

Distribution
This species occurs in the Northeast Pacific and off the Kuriles, Russia

References

External links
 To Encyclopedia of Life
 To World Register of Marine Species

galkini
Gastropods described in 1995